Henrik Gabriel "Heikki" Renvall (January 19, 1872 in Turku – June 1, 1955 in Helsinki) was a Finnish lawyer, journalist and the Head of the Editorial Board at the Finnish Ministry of Trade and Industry from 1917–1918. He married opera singer Aino Ackté, and their daughter was Glory Leppänen.

References

1872 births
1955 deaths
People from Turku
People from Turku and Pori Province (Grand Duchy of Finland)
Young Finnish Party politicians
National Coalition Party politicians
Finnish senators
Members of the Diet of Finland
Members of the Parliament of Finland (1907–08)
Members of the Parliament of Finland (1910–11)
Members of the Parliament of Finland (1911–13)
Members of the Parliament of Finland (1922–24)
People of the Finnish Civil War (White side)
19th-century Finnish lawyers
Finnish editors
Finnish women editors
University of Helsinki alumni
20th-century Finnish lawyers